Ma Lâm is a township and capital of Hàm Thuận Bắc District, Bình Thuận Province, Vietnam.

References

Populated places in Bình Thuận province
District capitals in Vietnam
Townships in Vietnam